The purple-red earth snake (Teretrurus sanguineus) is a species of nonvenomous shield tail snake, endemic to southern India. No subspecies are currently recognized.

Geographic range
Found in southern India in Wynaad, Travancore (in Nalumukku at 1,350 m elevation and Oothu at 1,300 m), the Manimuthar Hills (in the Western Ghats of the Tinnevelly district) and Nyamakad (Western Ghats of the Kerala Munar Hills at 2,200 m).

The type locality given is "Anamallay forests; 4,000 feet elevation."

Description
Dorsum brown or purplish red. Ventrum red, blotched with black in some specimens.

Total length .

Dorsal scales arranged in 15 rows at midbody (in 17 rows behind the head). Ventrals 120-150; subcaudals 5-10.

Eye distinct from the neighboring shields, of moderate size. Snout obtuse. Rostral small, but visible from above. Frontal longer than broad. Supraocular about as large as the eye, as long as or shorter than the prefrontals. Temporal about ½ the length of the parietals. Diameter of the body 22 to 28 times in the total length. Ventrals nearly two times as broad as the contiguous scales. In females dorsal scales of the tail smooth or faintly keeled. In males all the dorsal scales of the tail plus the last ventrals pluricarinate. Tail ending in a simple laterally compressed point.

References

Further reading

 Beddome, R.H. 1867. Descriptions and figures of Five New Snakes from the Madras Presidency. Madras Quart. J. Med. Sci., 11: 14-16. [Reprint: J. Soc. Bibliogr. Nat. Sci., London, 1 (10): 315- 317, 1940.]
 Beddome, R.H. 1876. Description of a new Species of Indian Snake of the Genus Platyplectrurus from the Wynad. Proc. Zool. Soc. London, 1876: 701.
 Beddome, R.H. 1886. An Account of the Earth-Snakes of the Peninsula of India and Ceylon. Ann. Mag. Nat. Hist. (5) 17: 3-33.

External links
 

Uropeltidae
Taxa named by Richard Henry Beddome